MS Color Magic is a cruiseferry owned and operated by the Norway-based shipping company Color Line on its route connecting Oslo, Norway, with Kiel, Germany. She was built at Aker Finnyards Rauma Shipyard, Finland in 2007 and has been the largest ferry in the world ever since.

Color Magic is a sister vessel of MS Color Fantasy, delivered to Color Line in 2004. The ship has over 1000 cabins and 54 suites. Unlike her sister, Color Fantasy was built in Turku. Color Magic has 89 more cabins than Color Fantasy, as well as larger conference facilities, making it slightly larger in terms of gross tonnage.

References

External links

 Color Line website for MS Color Magic

Cruiseferries
Ferries of Norway
Ships built in Turku
Ships built in Rauma, Finland
2006 ships
Color Line (ferry operator)
Merchant ships of Norway